Philip Joseph Deloria is a historian, author and member of the Dakota Nation who specializes in Native American, Western American, and environmental history. He is the son of scholar Vine Deloria, Jr., and the great nephew of ethnologist Ella Deloria.  Deloria is the author of the award-winning books Playing Indian (1998) and Indians in Unexpected Places (2004), among others. Deloria received his Ph.D. in American Studies from Yale University and currently teaches in the Department of History at Harvard University.
In 2021 he was elected to the American Philosophical Society.

Family background
Deloria is an enrolled member of the Standing Rock Sioux Tribe, and the son of Barbara and Vine Deloria Jr. His father was a scholar, writer, and activist for Native American rights who earned national recognition for his 1969 book, Custer Died for Your Sins: An Indian Manifesto. Philip J. Deloria's paternal great aunt Ella Deloria worked as an ethnologist, and Ella's sister Mary Sully was an artist. Deloria's grandfather, Vine Deloria Sr. and great grandfather Philip Joseph Deloria, also known as Thípi Sápa, were Episcopal priests. Philip J. Deloria is also the great-great grandson of U.S Army officer and painter Alfred Sully, and the great-great-great-grandson of painter Thomas Sully. Growing up, his mother was a librarian at the Fairhaven Library in Bellingham, Washington. After school he and his brother often read at the library until their mother's shift ended.

Education and career
Deloria graduated from the University of Colorado in 1982 with a B.M.E. in music education.   In 1988, Deloria completed his M.A. in journalism and mass communications at the University of Colorado.  Deloria received his Ph.D. in American studies from Yale University in 1994. Deloria worked as a professor at the University of Colorado in the Department of History from 1994 to 2000, before taking up a professorship at the University of Michigan, Ann Arbor, in both the Department of American Culture and the Department of History.  Deloria was the associate dean of undergraduate education in the University of Michigan, Ann Arbor's College of Literature Science and the Arts and was the Carroll Smith-Rosenberg Collegiate Professor. In 2018 he was made the first tenured professor of Native American history at Harvard University. He is a trustee of the National Museum  of the American Indian-Smithsonian and a former chair of the Repatriation Committee. Deloria is the 2022 president of the Organization of American Historians.
 2021: Curti Lecturer

Published works
Deloria is the author of two non-fiction books and a number of articles and book chapters.

Deloria's 1998 text, Playing Indian, addresses the historical phenomenon of "playing Indian", whereby non-Native people in the United States construct national and personal identities through the performance of Indian dress and ritual. It was adapted form his dissertation at Yale, which he finished in 1994.  Playing Indian won the 1999 Gustavus Myers Outstanding Book Award from the Gustavus Myers Program for the Study of Bigotry and Human Rights in North America.

Deloria's second book, Indians in Unexpected Places (2004), explores stereotypes of Native American people which confine them to the past and analyzes the seeming disunity between Indian people and modernity.  Indians in Unexpected Places received the John C. Ewers Prize for Ethnohistorical Writing in 2006 from the Western History Association.

Deloria additionally produced, directed, and edited PBS program Eyanopapi: Heart of the Sioux.

List of selected works
 Playing Indian. New Haven: Yale University Press, 1998. .
 Indians in Unexpected Places. Lawrence: University Press of Kansas, 1999. .
 Blackwell Companion to American Indian History, ed. Boston: Blackwell Publishers, 2002. 
 C.G. Jung and the Sioux Traditions: Dreams, Visions, Nature, and the Primitive, ed. New Orleans: Spring Journal Press, 2009.
 "Four Thousand Invitations." American Indian Quarterly 37, no. 3 (July 2013): 25-43.
 "American Master Narratives and the Problem of Indian Citizenship in the Gilded Age and Progressive Era." The Journal of the Gilded Age and Progressive Era 14, no. 1 (Jan 2015): 3-12.
 American Studies: A User's Guide. University of California Press, 2017. ISBN 9780520287730
 Becoming Mary Sully: Toward an American Indian Abstract. Seattle: University of Washington Press, 2019.
 "Thanksgiving in Myth and Reality," New Yorker Nov 25 (2-19): 70-70.
 "Tecumseh's doomed quest for a Native confederacy," New Yorker (November 2, 2020), 76-80.

References

1959 births
American people of English descent
American people of French descent
Standing Rock Sioux people
Living people
Native American academics
Native American writers
Yale Graduate School of Arts and Sciences alumni
University of Michigan faculty
21st-century American historians
Historians of Native Americans
University of Colorado alumni
University of Colorado faculty
Harvard University faculty
20th-century American historians
American male non-fiction writers
21st-century American male writers
20th-century American male writers
Members of the American Philosophical Society
Environmental historians